Hamilton Beach was a former Long Island Rail Road station on the Rockaway Beach Branch in Queens, New York City. It was located between two streets in Hamilton Beach, Queens, one of which no longer exists and is part of land owned by JFK Airport.

History
Hamilton Beach station was originally built in 1919 by the Long Island Rail Road nearly 12 years after the disastrous fire that destroyed the Howard's Landing station and the hotel that it served. It also served as a replacement for Ramblersville, which was eventually renamed Howard Beach station. Throughout its existence, the station was never anything more than two sheltered shacks along both platforms. It was the southernmost station having four tracks of the Rockaway Beach Branch, which narrowed down to two tracks at the "WD Tower" (later "BEACH Tower") and crossed Jamaica Bay.

Farther south in Jamaica Bay, a fire destroyed the line at The Raunt on May 7–8, 1950, transforming Hamilton Beach into the terminus of the legitimate Rockaway Beach Branch. Trains that actually went to the line's namesake followed the rest of the Atlantic Branch onto the Far Rockaway Branch, where it merged at Hammels Wye. The Rockaway Beach Branch was sold to the New York City Transit Authority in 1955, and Hamilton Beach Station closed on June 27, along with nearby Howard Beach station. Most stations on the line south of Ozone Park closed on October 3, 1955, before being reopened as subway stations along the IND Rockaway Line on June 28, 1956. Hamilton Beach station was not one of them.

References

External links
Electrification of Rockaway Beach Branch from Ozone Park to Hammel's Wye
Hamilton Beach Station vicinity (Road and Rail Pictures)

Former Long Island Rail Road stations in New York City
Railway stations in the United States opened in 1919
Railway stations closed in 1955
Railway stations in Queens, New York
1919 establishments in New York City
1955 disestablishments in New York (state)